José Nadson Ferreira (born 18 October 1984), commonly known as Nadson, is a Brazilian former footballer who played as a centre-back.

Career

Club
On 14 December 2012, Genk announced the extension of Nadson's contract until June 2015.

On 31 August 2013, Nadson joined PFC Krylia Sovetov Samara. He left Krylia Sovetov in January 2019.

On 3 March 2019, he signed with Finnish club SJK. On 20 July 2020, he terminated his contract and left the club.

Career statistics

Club

Honours
Sheriff Tiraspol	
Moldovan National Division: 2006–07, 2007–08
Moldovan Cup: 2007–08
Moldovan Super Cup: 2007
Commonwealth of Independent States Cup: 2009

Genk
Belgian Pro League: 2010–11
Belgian Super Cup: 2011
Belgian Cup: 2012–13

References

External links
 

1984 births
Living people
Brazilian footballers
Brazilian expatriate footballers
Brazilian expatriate sportspeople in Moldova
Expatriate footballers in Moldova
Brazilian expatriate sportspeople in Belgium
Expatriate footballers in Belgium
Santos FC players
Londrina Esporte Clube players
Clube Atlético Bragantino players
FC Sheriff Tiraspol players
K.R.C. Genk players
Belgian Pro League players
Association football defenders
PFC Krylia Sovetov Samara players
Seinäjoen Jalkapallokerho players
Expatriate footballers in Russia
Russian Premier League players
Moldovan Super Liga players
Expatriate footballers in Finland